Mt. Baker Banked Slalom, also known as the Legendary Banked Slalom (LBS), is a snowboarding contest held annually since 1985 at Mt. Baker Ski Area, in Washington State, United States. The LBS is regarded as the predecessor to the boardercross event, and has been won by some of the biggest names in the history of snowboarding. The winner receives a Duct Tape trophy and an embroidered Carhartt jacket. Terje Håkonsen is the winningest male pro snowboarder with 7 trophies over a 17-year period; the winningest female pro snowboarder is Maëlle Ricker with 7 consecutive wins from 2007 to 2013.

History
The first race was held in 1985, organized by Bob Barci and Tom Sims. With only 14 riders at the top of the  course, they raced through 15 gates with only a few spectators present. The decision to put on the banked slalom at Mt. Baker came about because it was one of the few ski areas in North America that welcomed snowboarders at that time.

Winners
Presented below are the Pro Men and Pro Women champions per the LBS Honor Roll.

References

External links

Platinum: The Legendary Banked Slalom - 20 Years and Beyond

Snowboarding competitions
Sports in Washington (state)